The Central African Football Federation (RCA) is the governing body of football in the Central African Republic. It was founded in 1961, affiliated to FIFA in 1964.  The offices of the RCA are located in Bangui, the capital city.  The federation organizes the national football leagues, including the Central African Republic League, and the national team.

Achievements

UNIFFAC Cup
 Winners 2010

References

External links
 Central African Republic at the FIFA website.
Central African Republic at the CAF website.

Central African Republic
Football in the Central African Republic
Bangui
Sports organizations established in 1961